This is a list of winners of the Dundee International Book Prize by year.

List

2000
Andrew Murray Scott's book Tumulus (inaugural winner 2000) detailed bohemian Dundee through the 60s and 70s to the present day. The judges said that it "reveals a great knowledge and love of Dundee while paying the city the compliment of being intelligently amused by various aspects of its life and outlook".

2002
Claire-Marie Watson's The Curewife (2002) drew on the tale of Dundee's last execution of a witch – Grissel Jaffray in 1669. Hilary Mantel said that it won as it had a "highly charged atmosphere and its real sense of the dark and brooding".

2005
Malcolm Archibald's Whales for a Wizard (2005) was an adventure story based around the whaling industry in Dundee in the 1860s. It was called an "old-fashioned, traditional, rip-roaring adventure story" by Ian Rankin.

2007
Fiona Dunscombe's The Triple Point of Water (2007) drew on her experiences of working in Soho during the 1980s.

2009
Chris Longmuir's Dead Wood (2009) was a grizzly crime novel set in a world of violence and gangland retribution. The List calls it "lacklustre", "Flat and clunky", and "a poor addition to the Scottish crime genre".

2010
Alan Wright's Act of Murder (2010) was a tale of magic, poisonings and thespians, with some gruesome murders thrown in for good measure set in Victorian times in Lancashire. It was called a "worthy winner for a prize" in a review by Fife Today.

2011
Simon Ashe-Browne's Nothing Human Left (2011) was a psychological thriller set in a Dublin public school as a schoolboy's criminal desires reach a frightening conclusion.

2012
Jacob Appel's The Man Who Wouldn't Stand Up was a satire of post-9/11 patriotism in the United States, called by Stephen Fry, a 2012 judge, "darkly comic", and fellow judge Philip Pullman called it "Engaging, funny, ingenious, even charming".

2013
Nicola White's 2013 winner In the Rosary Garden (2013) is a murder mystery set in a convent school; being described by critics as "as good as it gets", A. L. Kennedy, a 2013 judge. called it "courageous and intelligent"

2014
Amy Mason's The Other Ida won the 2014 prize. The novel focuses on two sisters in the wake of their mother's death; their struggle and the tension between the siblings play out as the two attempt to come to terms with loss.

2015
Martin Cathcart Froden's Devil Take the Hindmost takes place in London during the 1920s and revolves around a cyclist caught up in the fevered bets and loan sharks of the velodrome racing scene.

2016
The final prize was awarded to Jessica Thummel's The Cure for Lonely.

References

External links
Dundee International Book Prize Home Page

Dundee International Book Prize, Winners
Dundee International Book Prize, Winners
Dundee International Book Prize, winners
Dundee International Book Prize, Winners